The Northam Bridge is a road bridge across the River Itchen in Southampton, England, linking the suburbs of Northam and Bitterne Manor. The current bridge was the first major prestressed concrete road bridge to be built in the United Kingdom. The bridge carries the A3024 road as a dual carriageway, with two lanes on each carriageway.

History
Prior to the construction of the Northam Bridge, the southernmost bridge across the River Itchen was at Mansbridge. Mansbridge was the lowest crossing point of the river until the early 18th century, when the Itchen Ferry began operating between Woolston and St Mary's, downriver of Northam.

The Northam Bridge was the idea of David Lance, who acquired land in Bitterne and built Chessel House there in 1796. Realising that access to his land was poor, he encouraged the building of a bridge linking Bitterne Manor to Northam, together with roads from the bridge to Botley and a further bridge over the River Hamble in Bursledon (and onwards to Portsmouth), with the fork between the Bursledon and Botley roads passing close to Chessel House. The Northam Bridge Company was formed in 1796, funded mainly by Portsmouth businessmen.

The new route between Portsmouth and Southampton would be four miles (6 km) shorter than travelling via Mansbridge, and as a result the proposal to improve transport between the two important port cities was keenly supported by the Admiralty, especially since this was the time of the Napoleonic Wars. Consequently, when the Northam Bridge Company sought an Act of Parliament to build a bridge, the Act was passed quickly.

The new roads and bridges were built in 1799, and were originally operated as toll roads.  The first Northam Bridge was of wooden construction.

The Northam Bridge Company spent 1834 and 1885 putting much effort into opposing first the construction of a swing bridge further down the Itchen and then construction of the Woolston Floating Bridge. In the case of the former they were successful in the later they were not. The Northam Bridge company responded to the opening of the Woolston Floating Bridge by reducing their tolls by three quarters.

The wooden Northam Bridge  was replaced in 1889 by an iron bridge at a cost of £9,000.

The bridge remained a toll bridge until 1929 when the ownership was transferred from the private sector to the Southampton Corporation. The bridge cost the council £79,238 after arbitration. It was this change of ownership that allowed the first bus route across the River Itchen to be established in Southampton; Southampton Corporation decided against extending the existing tram lines across the bridge, opting instead to establish a double-decker bus service. On 18 March 1941 the bridge was damaged during an air raid.

The iron bridge was replaced in 1954 with a third bridge, made of prestressed concrete, and it is this bridge that still stands today. The third Northam Bridge was the first major prestressed concrete road bridge to be built in the UK and cost £600,000.

In January 2015 the bridge was partially closed to allow waterproofing work to be carried out at a cost of £1.2m as part of a national £317m programme of works dubbed the "pinch-point programme".

Construction and dimensions

The third bridge utilised the latest technology available at the time but the style of the bridge was of the pre-war era.  The main deck structure has transverse diaphragms and narrowly spaced beams, which were pre-cast on site using deflected cables.  Pre-cast, pre-stressed slabs, known as junction slabs or continuity slabs, were placed between the tops of the beams by transverse stressing over a length where the flanges of the tees were removed.  These, together with in situ diaphragms between the ends of the beams, allowed the deck structure to be made continuous for live and superimposed loads.  After the junction slabs were in place, the main beams were post-tensioned through the diaphragms.

The cement used to make the concrete in the bridge was Ordinary Portland Cement, which was both cheaper and resulted in less shrinkage than using rapid-hardening cement. It was used in a ratio of 1:1:3 - a mix which used more cement than German and British practice at the time - and a water-to-cement ratio of 0.3.

The consulting engineers responsible for the new bridge were Rendel Palmer & Tritton, the same firm used for Waterloo Bridge in London nine years earlier.

The bridge is 148 metres long in total, and the supporting piers are up to 32 metres apart.

Local Legend
The bridge is reportedly haunted by the ghost of a soaking wet young girl. In a local variation of the classic vanishing hitchhiker urban legend the girl is picked up by police but vanishes from their car before they arrive at the address she has given. Later inquiries at the address reveal she has been dead for several months.

References

External links

Image of the second (iron) bridge)

Buildings and structures in Southampton
Bridges in Hampshire
Bridges completed in 1799
Bridges completed in 1954
Concrete bridges in the United Kingdom
Transport in Southampton
Reportedly haunted locations in South East England
Former toll bridges in England